WTBR may refer to:
                  
WTBR-FM, a radio station broadcasting in Pittsfield, Massachusetts, United States 
West Texas Boys Ranch, a Christian private residential community for boys located in Tankersley, Tom Green County, Texas